Penkov is a Bulgarian masculine surname, its feminine counterpart is Penkova. It may refer to
Galina Penkova (born 1958), Bulgarian sprinter 
Herman Penkov (born 1994), Ukrainian football goalkeeper
Maria Penkova (born 1984), Bulgarian tennis player 
Miroslav Penkov (born 1982), Bulgarian writer
Nikolay Penkov (born 1947), Bulgarian football defender
Sofia Penkova (born 1979), Bulgarian figure skater

Bulgarian-language surnames